= Orbital velocity =

Orbital velocity may refer to the following:

- The orbital angular velocity
- The orbital speed of a revolving body in a gravitational field.
- The velocity of particles due to wave motion, such as those in wind waves
- The equivalent velocity of a bound electron needed to produce its orbital kinetic energy
